Hayya (also Haiya) is a village  in the Red Sea State of Sudan. Hayya sits at the point where the railways and the roads which come from Atbara and Kassala, meet, and continue towards Suakin and Port Sudan. It is also a junction station on the mainline of the Sudan railway network.

See also 

 Railway stations in Sudan

Notes

Populated places in Red Sea (state)